Waretown is an unincorporated community and census-designated place (CDP) located within Ocean Township, in Ocean County, New Jersey, United States. As of the 2010 United States Census, the CDP's population was 1,569. Waretown is home to Albert Music Hall.

Geography
According to the United States Census Bureau, the CDP had a total area of 0.925 square miles (2.395 km2), including 0.899 square miles (2.328 km2) of land and 0.026 square miles (0.067 km2) of water (2.81%).

Demographics

Census 2010

The Census Bureau's 2006-2010 American Community Survey showed that (in 2010 inflation-adjusted dollars) median household income was $78,750 (with a margin of error of +/- $4,931) and the median family income was $85,043 (+/- $13,392). Males had a median income of $53,438 (+/- $21,536) versus $31,172 (+/- $19,721) for females. The per capita income for the borough was $45,330 (+/- $18,923). About 0.0% of families and 4.4% of the population were below the poverty line, including 4.7% of those under age 18 and 0.0% of those age 65 or over.

2000 Census
As of the 2000 United States Census there were 1,582 people, 641 households, and 439 families living in the CDP. The population density was 656.8/km2 (1,694.4/mi2). There were 791 housing units at an average density of 328.4/km2 (847.2/mi2). The racial makeup of the CDP was 97.79% White, 0.44% African American, 0.06% Native American, 0.32% Asian, 0.06% from other races, and 1.33% from two or more races. Hispanic or Latino of any race were 2.28% of the population.

There were 641 households, out of which 28.1% had children under the age of 18 living with them, 54.4% were married couples living together, 9.2% had a female householder with no husband present, and 31.5% were non-families. 26.4% of all households were made up of individuals, and 13.1% had someone living alone who was 65 years of age or older. The average household size was 2.47 and the average family size was 2.98.

In the CDP the population was spread out, with 22.2% under the age of 18, 7.1% from 18 to 24, 29.1% from 25 to 44, 25.4% from 45 to 64, and 16.2% who were 65 years of age or older. The median age was 40 years. For every 100 females, there were 97.0 males. For every 100 females age 18 and over, there were 96.6 males.

The median income for a household in the CDP was $44,410, and the median income for a family was $56,429. Males had a median income of $35,547 versus $26,667 for females. The per capita income for the CDP was $22,061. About 1.7% of families and 5.6% of the population were below the poverty line, including 5.1% of those under age 18 and 8.2% of those age 65 or over.

Transportation

New Jersey Transit provides bus service to Atlantic City on the 559 bus route. Numbered routes that run through the community include U.S. Route 9 and County Route 532. Waretown is served by exit 69 of the Garden State Parkway.

Notable people

People who were born in, residents of, or otherwise closely associated with Waretown include:
 George E. Smith (born 1930), winner of the 2009 Nobel Prize winner in Physics for his work on the charge-coupled device.

References

External links

 Ocean Township website
 Waretown Branch of Ocean County Library

Census-designated places in Ocean County, New Jersey
Ocean Township, Ocean County, New Jersey
Populated places in the Pine Barrens (New Jersey)